Bayero Salih-Farah (born 11 March 1964), is the current director-general of the Nigerian Institute of Transport Technology, Zaria.

Salih-Farah was born at Kagoro, Kaura Local Government Area of Kaduna State. In 1987 he obtained a Bachelor of Science Degree in Geography from the Usmanu Danfodiyo University. He is also an alumnus of Ahmadu Bello University, Nigerian Institute of Transport Technology (NITT) and the University of Huddersfield, UK, where he obtained his PhD

References 

Nigerian civil servants
People from Kaduna State
Ahmadu Bello University alumni
1964 births
Living people
Usmanu Danfodiyo University alumni